The UIC identification marking for tractive stock is a standard for identifying train stock like locomotives that supply tractive force primarily in Europe. Since the beginning of 2007 locomotives or other traction units in Europe have been given a 12-digit number. Vehicle numbering is now governed by the Intergovernmental Organisation for International Carriage by Rail and in Technical Specifications for Interoperability (TSI) of the European Union, specifically the European Railway Agency's CR OPE TSI (Conventional Rail OPErations Technical Specification for Interoperability). This makes the locomotive clearly identifiable within Europe and parts of Asia and northern Africa (see List of UIC country codes).

A complete number is referred to as a European Vehicle Number and comprises 12 digits as originally outlined in UIC Code of Practice 438-3, Identification marking for tractive stock. Digits 1–2 are the type code, 3–4 the country of origin (where the vehicle is registered), 5–11 are defined by the country concerned, 12 is the check digit calculated via the Luhn algorithm. It is followed by abbreviations for the country of origin and the owner of the vehicle.
 
The EU CR OPE TSI required that by 1 August 2008 all traction units had to be registered and marked with their number. Existing locomotive numbers used internally were not necessarily affected, but meanwhile in many countries the vehicles got 12-digit numbers.

International section

Type code 

Digit 1 is '9'
 
If digit 2 describes the type of tractive stock, the following coding is mandatory:

The above codes have been altered from those shown in UIC 438-3 by ERA CR OPE TSI; this table was updated on 22 January 2012 to include the most recent wording.

Country code 
see List of UIC country codes

National Block

Germany 

A register of tractive units has been introduced by the Federal Railway Office (Eisenbahnbundesamt, EBA), which also issues vehicle numbers. Digits 5–8 are a four-digit class number, 9–11 the three-digit serial number of the vehicle within its class.

For class numbers for vehicles in the existing Deutsche Bahn fleet, DB selected digits 5–8 so that the previous number could continue to be used without affecting the check digit: changing the check digit was needed only for combustion-engined railcars. For new DB vehicles, such as the Alstom Class 1214 introduced in 2008, this is not valid. Although they are internally counted as Class 262, they have been given a number corresponding to the class used by the manufacturer.

As a result of the requirement to be entered into the register, vehicles and classes were included that had never been part of the DB. These were allocated to new classes by the EBA, no longer based around DB historical classification. This has caused misunderstandings, because the classes are now generally made up of four-digit numbers (digits 5–8) that no longer indicate the type of vehicle, now shown by the type code (digits 1–2).

Example:

From the last three digits, class "0128" could appear to be an electric locomotive. However the full number includes the type code "98", so it is a diesel shunter. The three-digit numbers "3xy" or "2xy" previously used by DB are not part of the new numbers. They are obsolete, found only in the numbers of former state railway vehicles.

Vehicles that are used both by DB and private railways are allocated to the same class – the difference is recognisable from the owner's abbreviation. One advantage of the system is its simplicity, because when vehicles change ownership they retain the same number: only the abbreviation of the owner's name needs to be changed. For a major rebuild the number can be changed to that of an appropriate class.

See also List of classes in the German Railway Vehicle Register

Italy 

In Italy document ANSF 04658/09 issued on 17-08-2009 by ANSF (Agenzia Nazionale per la Sicurezza delle Ferrovie), who maintains the RIN (Registro Immatricolazione Nazionale). According to these rules, digits 5-11 are thus subdivided: Digit 5 is the vehicle type

The following 3 digits are the class number (the Italian word is 'Gruppo') while the digits 9–11 the three-digit serial number of the vehicle within its class.

The method of applying and spacing the digits differs between operators. 
For example a British Rail Class 66 loco registered in Britain has been seen to carry the number:
GB 9 2 70 0 066246-4, with the existing national number "66246" underlined, and lacking the operator identifying code.
Frequently the commonly used national part of the number is underlined in order to make it more readily identifiable.

Check digit 
The check digit is calculated from digits 1–11 using the Luhn algorithm. It is derived from the sum of the numbers that arise when the digits are alternately multiplied by 2 and 1; the difference of this sum from the next multiple of ten produces the check digit (for examples of this see wagon numbers).

Keeper's code 

For every railway that enters its tractive units into the register, a clear European-wide code is needed, separate from the number. This alphanumerical Vehicle Keeper Marking (VKM) is allocated by a railway administration in accordance with CR OPE TSI. The list of keeper codes is linked below. (The keeper will be different to the owner of a vehicle where a leasing agreement is in force.)

Example

Older identification systems

In the past, each railway adopted its own identification system. Each locomotive was given a road number or running number which would sometimes be combined with a class number. For example British Rail diesel and electric locomotives have five-digit numbers of which the first two digits are the class number and the remaining digits are the running number, e.g. 37 409.

See also 
 UIC classification of locomotive axle arrangements
 UIC classification of railway coaches
 UIC classification of goods wagons
 UIC country codes

References

External links 

 Download site for UIC Code of Practice 438-3 Identification marking for tractive stock (chargeable download)
 Download site for European Railway Agency CR OPE TSI (free download, supersedes UIC 438-3). Archive of original.
  Text of EU decision 2011/314/EU], Appendix P contains numbering rules
 EBA presentation on the vehicle register
Owner's abbreviations (Vehicle Keeper Markings) listed by the European Railway Agency
United Kingdom Railway Group Standard GM/RT2453, including rules for allocation of a European Vehicle Number (UIC number) and requirements for identification marking for tractive stock

Locomotive classification systems
identification marking for tractive stock
Rail transport standards
Rail transport in Europe
Railway vehicles register numbers